Wethers is a surname. Notable people with the surname include:

Brian Wethers (born 1980), American basketball player
Doris L. Wethers (1927–2019), American pediatrician

See also
Grey Wethers, two neolithic sites in England
Wether (disambiguation)